Lilly Rani is a 2022 Indian Tamil-language drama film directed by Vishnu Ramakrishnan and starring Chaya Singh, Thambi Ramaiah and Dushyanth Jayaprakash. It was released on 9 September 2022.

Cast
Chaya Singh as Rani
Thambi Ramaiah as Moorthy
Dushyanth Jayaprakash as Michael
Jayaprakash
Boopalan
Raqath Fathima
Akash Ram as Police Constable

Reception
The film was released on 9 September 2022 across Tamil Nadu. A critic from Maalai Malar gave the film a mixed review, noting that it "could have been better". A reviewer from Times of India gave the film a negative review, writing "director Vishnu Ramakrishnan's idea to start this film as an emotional drama and to end it as a quirky thriller is laudable. But the writing isn't organic and does nothing to keep us engrossed".

References

External links

2022 films
2020s Tamil-language films